Searle Truman "Cy" Proffitt (October 26, 1911 – February 13, 1996) was an American professional basketball player. He played for the Indianapolis Kautskys in the National Basketball League and averaged 4.3 points per game.

References

1911 births
1996 deaths
American men's basketball players
Basketball players from Indiana
Butler Bulldogs men's basketball players
Forwards (basketball)
Indianapolis Kautskys players
People from Lebanon, Indiana
Player-coaches